The 1932 Singapore Open, also known as the 1932 Singapore Badminton Championships, took place from 9 July – 16 October 1932 at the S.V.C Drill Hall in City Hall, Singapore. The ties were played over a few months with the first round ties being played on the 9th of July and the last few ties (the men's and women's singles finals) were played on the 16th of October. There were no women's and mixed doubles competition being held due to the lack of entries.

Final results

References 

Singapore Open (badminton)
1932 in badminton